Ciserano is a comune (municipality) in the Province of Bergamo in the Italian region of Lombardy, located about  northeast of Milan and about  southwest of Bergamo.

Ciserano borders the following municipalities: Arcene, Boltiere, Pontirolo Nuovo, Verdellino, Verdello.

Demographic evolution

Sports
U.S. Ciserano, is the Italian football of the city and was founded in 1951. Currently it plays in Italy's Serie D after the promotion from Eccellenza Lombardy Girone B in the 2013–14 season.

The president is Olivo Foglieni and the manager is Oscar Magoni.

Its home ground is Stadio Giacinto Facchetti of Cologno al Serio. The team's colors are red and blue.

References

External links
 www.comune.ciserano.bg.it/